Jana Novotná and Arantxa Sánchez Vicario were the defending champions but only Sánchez Vicario competed that year with Mary Joe Fernández.

Fernández and Sánchez Vicario won in the final 6–3, 6–2 against Inés Gorrochategui and Irina Spîrlea.

Seeds
Champion seeds are indicated in bold text while text in italics indicates the round in which those seeds were eliminated. The top seeded team received a bye into the quarterfinals.

 Mary Joe Fernández /  Arantxa Sánchez Vicario (champions)
 Amy Frazier /  Kimberly Po (first round)
 Rika Hiraki /  Florencia Labat (quarterfinals)
 Patty Schnyder /  Linda Wild (quarterfinals)

Draw

External links
 1997 Páginas Amarillas Open Doubles Draw

Doubles